1809 was the 23rd season of cricket in England since the foundation of Marylebone Cricket Club (MCC).  Thomas Lord opened his Middle Ground after refusing to pay increased rent at the Old Ground.

Honours
 Most runs – Lord Frederick Beauclerk 464 (HS 114)
 Most wickets – Thomas Howard 35

Events
 MCC made revisions to the Laws of Cricket which were republished in their entirety.
 The umpires were required to select the pitch from 1809 with choice of innings to be decided by toss.
 It is about this time that the no-ball rule was first applied re the bowler's foot being over the crease. It would be applied to throwing in 1816.
 Lord's Old Ground, home of Marylebone Cricket Club (MCC), had become the accepted venue for all great matches and it was the ambition of every aspiring cricketer to play there. But Lord's was already losing its rural character as London expanded and began to surround it. The landlord, Mr Portman, felt able to increase the rent and so Thomas Lord decided to seek another venue. The lease on the "Old Ground" was due to expire on Lady Day in 1810 but Lord moved fast and, by May 1809, had secured a lease on another plot of land, part of the St John's Wood estate which belonged to the Eyre family. He opened this "Middle Ground" in time for the 1809 season but MCC at first refused to relocate and continued to play at the Old Ground until the winter of 1810–11 when Lord staged a fait accompli by literally seizing "his turf" which was dug up and moved to the Middle Ground.
 John Sherman made his debut in first-class cricket. His career continued to 1852 and is the joint-longest on record, equalled only by W. G. Grace from 1865 to 1908.
 With the Napoleonic War continuing, loss of investment and manpower impacted cricket and only 8 first-class matches have been recorded in 1809:
 1–3 June — MCC v All-England @ Lord's Old Ground
 13–16 June — MCC v All-England @ Lord's Old Ground
 27–29 June — All-England v Surrey @ Lord's Old Ground
 11–13 July — Surrey v All-England @ Holt Pound, Farnham
 17–20 July — All-England v Four Chosen & Seven Others @ Lord's Old Ground
 22–24 August — All-England v Surrey @ Bowman's Lodge, Dartford
 5–7 September — All-England v Surrey @ Lord's Old Ground
 20–22 September — Lord F Beauclerk's XI v FC Ladbroke's XI @ Lord's Old Ground

Debutants
1809 debutants included:
 Edmund Carter (MCC)
 John Sherman (Surrey)

References

Bibliography

Further reading
 
 
 
 
 

1809 in English cricket
English cricket seasons in the 19th century